Sacksonville was a nickname given to the defense of the Jacksonville Jaguars during their 2017 season. Their defensive coordinator was Todd Wash. The nickname derived from the high number of sacks tallied by the defense (55), which was second only to the Pittsburgh Steelers, who accumulated 56 sacks. Ranked second overall, the defense revitalized a Jaguars team that went 3–13 the  previous season to a 10–6 record and AFC South division title, culminating in an AFC Championship Game appearance.

The Sacksonville defense was short-lived as the Jaguars returned to the bottom of the AFC South during their next three seasons, while the defense regressed to ranking 25th in 2019. By 2022, all members of the defense left the team.

History
After a 29–7 blowout win in Week 1 of the  season over the Houston Texans, in which the Jacksonville Jaguars recorded ten sacks (including four by newly acquired Calais Campbell), the Jaguars fanbase collectively started a trend called "Sacksonville." Jacksonville won nine more games to finish with a 10–6 record, making the postseason for the first time since 2007 and clinching their division for the first time since 1999. The division title was also the franchise's first AFC South title, as the Jaguars played in the AFC Central from 1995 to 2001.

The Jaguars won the AFC wild card game over the Buffalo Bills at home, 10–3. In the Divisional round they defeated the Pittsburgh Steelers in Pittsburgh, 45–42. The Jaguars then traveled to New England for their first AFC Championship Game since 1999, where they lost 24–20 to the New England Patriots, ending their season. Following the season, cornerbacks Jalen Ramsey and A. J. Bouye, defensive end Calais Campbell, defensive tackle Malik Jackson, and linebacker Telvin Smith earned Pro Bowl honors. Ramsey and Campbell earned First-Team All-Pro honors, while Smith and Bouye earned Second-Team honors. Following Campbell pulling out of the Pro Bowl due to injury, teammate Yannick Ngakoue went to the Pro Bowl as an alternate.

In 2018, the Jaguars defense once again started strong, leading the team to a 3–1 record through its first four games, including a victory over the New England Patriots in an AFC Championship Game rematch. However, injuries and poor play by the offense contributed to significant degradation by the defense, as the team would go on to lose seven straight games and 10 of its last 12, being eliminated from playoff contention after Week 14.  Jacksonville's record regressed to 5–11.

The unit dissolved with the Jaguars having one of the league's worst defenses in 2019 and multiple players leaving the team. Linebacker Myles Jack, the last remaining member of the Sacksonville defense, left the team in 2022.

Starting lineup
Source:

Statistics

References

Jacksonville Jaguars
Nicknamed groups of American football players